Araeoscelis (from  , 'thin' and  , 'ribs of beef') is an extinct genus of reptile, and one of the earliest diapsids. Fossils have been found in the Nocona, Arroyo and Waggoner Ranch Formations in Texas, dating to the Early Permian. Two species have been described, A. casei and A. gracilis.

Description 
 
It differed from earlier forms, such as Petrolacosaurus, in that its teeth were larger and blunter; possibly they were used for cracking insect carapaces.

Unlike its close relatives, which exhibit the two pairs of skull openings characteristic of diapsids, in Araeoscelis the lower pair of temporal fenestrae were closed with bone, resulting in a euryapsid condition. This would have made the skull more solid, presumably allowing a more powerful bite.

Ichnology 
Footprints found in Nova Scotia have been attributed to Araeoscelis or a close relative.

References

Further reading 
 
 
 

Prehistoric diapsids
Artinskian
Permian reptiles of North America
Taxa named by Samuel Wendell Williston
Permian United States
Paleontology in Texas
Fossil taxa described in 1910
Prehistoric reptile genera